Kassen is a German language surname. Notable people with the name include:

 Adam Kassen (1974), American independent film director, actor, writer and producer
 Mark Kassen (1971), American actor, director and producer

References 

German-language surnames